Milford Township may refer to:

Illinois
 Milford Township, Iroquois County, Illinois

Indiana
 Milford Township, LaGrange County, Indiana

Iowa
 Milford Township, Crawford County, Iowa
 Milford Township, Dickinson County, Iowa
 Milford Township, Story County, Iowa

Kansas
 Milford Township, Geary County, Kansas

Michigan
 Milford Township, Michigan

Minnesota
 Milford Township, Brown County, Minnesota

Missouri
 Milford Township, Barton County, Missouri

Ohio
 Milford Township, Butler County, Ohio
 Milford Township, Defiance County, Ohio
 Milford Township, Knox County, Ohio

Pennsylvania
 Milford Township, Bucks County, Pennsylvania
 Milford Township, Juniata County, Pennsylvania
 Milford Township, Pike County, Pennsylvania
 Milford Township, Somerset County, Pennsylvania

South Dakota
 Milford Township, Beadle County, South Dakota, in Beadle County, South Dakota

Township name disambiguation pages